Mashimo is a monotypic genus of East African cribellate araneomorph spiders in the family Dictynidae containing the single species, Mashimo leleupi. It was first described by Pekka T. Lehtinen in 1967, and has only been found in Zambia.

References

Dictynidae
Monotypic Araneomorphae genera
Spiders of Africa
Taxa named by Pekka T. Lehtinen